Rob Bordson (born June 9, 1988) is an American professional ice hockey forward who is currently playing under contract with the Stavanger Oilers in the Norwegian Eliteserien.

Playing career
Bordson signed a two-year entry level contract with the Anaheim Ducks on March 23, 2010 after playing three seasons of collegiate hockey with the University of Minnesota Duluth. Shortly into his first professional season, Bordson was traded to the Philadelphia Flyers with Danny Syvret for David Laliberte and Patrick Maroon.

Bordson was part of the blockbuster trade that sent Mike Richards to the Los Angeles Kings for Wayne Simmonds, Brayden Schenn, and a 2012 2nd round pick on June 23, 2011 He was not tendered a qualifying offer by the Kings, making him an unrestricted free agent.

On September 15, 2011, Bordson was signed by the Trenton Titans of the ECHL. During the 2011–12 season, on December 9, 2011, Bordson was signed by the Rochester Americans of the AHL to a professional try out (PTO). He was returned to the Titans before he was signed by former team the Adirondack Phantoms on February 21, 2012, for the remainder of the season.

On August 12, 2014, Bordson signed a contract with the Chicago Wolves.

On September 14, 2015, Bordson signed as a free agent, returning to the ECHL for the first time since 2011, in agreeing to a deal with the Adirondack Thunder for their inaugural season. He was elected captain to start the 2015–16 season, and was named the player of the month for October in leading the ECHL in all offensive categories. With 13 points in 7 games Bordson returned to the AHL on November 6, 2015, signing a one-year contract with the Providence Bruins.

At the conclusion of the 2015–16 season, Bordson elected to embark on a European career, agreeing to a one-year contract as a free agent with new German DEL entrant the Fischtown Pinguins on July 14, 2016. Bordson endured a successful start to his European adventure, contributing with 30 assists and 38 points in 45 games during the 2016–17 season.

Opting to leave Fischtown at the conclusion of his contract, Bordson continued in the DEL, agreeing to a one-year deal with Düsseldorfer EG on August 31, 2017. In the 2017–18 season, Bordson was unable to replicate his scoring rate with DEG, recording just 3 goals in 31 games as the club missed the playoffs. His contract was not renewed at the conclusion of the season.

On July 26, 2018, Bordson signed a one-year contract in the neighbouring Austrian Hockey League (EBEL), with the Dornbirn Bulldogs. Prior to the 2018–19 campaign, Bordson suffered a season ending knee injury in the pre-season with the Bulldogs, cutting short his tenure with the club without making his debut.

After a full year of rehabilitation, Bordson resumed his professional career in agreeing to a one-year contract with Swedish club, Västerviks IK of the HockeyAllsvenskan on July 11, 2019. He split the season between Sweden and the Finnish Liiga joining HPK to end the 2019–20 season, registering 4 assists in 10 games before the remainder of the season was cancelled due to the COVID-19 pandemic.

Spending four seasons abroad in Europe, on October 6, 2020, Bordson returned to North America by agreeing to a contract with the Kansas City Mavericks of the ECHL. As captain of the Mavericks for the 2020–21 season, Bordson in a top scoring line role produced 17 goals and 50 points through 57 regular season games.

On July 7, 2021, Bordson returned to the Adirondack Thunder of the ECHL as a free agent. Before making his return, Bordson left the club after securing a European contract with Norwegian club, Stavanger Oilers, on October 5, 2021.

Career statistics

References

External links

Rob Bordson's profile at HockeysFuture.com

1988 births
Adirondack Phantoms players
Adirondack Thunder players
American men's ice hockey left wingers
Cedar Rapids RoughRiders players
Chicago Wolves players
Düsseldorfer EG players
Fischtown Pinguins players
HPK players
Iowa Wild players
Kansas City Mavericks players
Living people
Ice hockey people from Duluth, Minnesota
Minnesota Duluth Bulldogs men's ice hockey players
Providence Bruins players
Rochester Americans players
Stavanger Oilers players
Syracuse Crunch players
Trenton Titans players
Västerviks IK players